Ngape Township is a township of Minbu District in the Magway Division of Myanmar.  The principal town is Ngape.

References

References

Townships of Magway Region